is an adventure manga by Kazutoshi Soyama published by Shogakukan in CoroCoro Comic since October 2001. The series was adapted as a 51-episode anime broadcast on TV Tokyo from April 2004 to March 2005, which is licensed by Viz Media in North America as Grandpa Danger, and a series of video games. A second anime television series premiered on October 20, 2012.

Characters 

Protagonist of this work. A self-proclaimed old man who teaches how to survive the dangers of the world.

Grandpa's grandchild.

The principal of the school that Yosuke attends.

Grandpa's pet. Mysterious cat-like creature.

Principal's dog.

The strongest uncle in history.

References

External links 

2001 manga
2004 anime television series debuts
2012 anime television series debuts
Japanese children's animated adventure television series
Adventure anime and manga
Anime series based on manga
J.C.Staff
Shogakukan franchises
Shōnen manga
Winners of the Shogakukan Manga Award for children's manga
TV Tokyo original programming
Viz Media anime